Wakaleo alcootaensis was a species of marsupial lion of the genus Wakaleo, that lived during the late Miocene, about 10 million years ago.

Taxonomy 
The first description was given in an examination of material discovered at Alcoota in the Northern Territory of Australia. The holotype was a single fossil maxilla fragment found in 1974 by the palaeontologist Michael Archer.

Description 
The largest and most recent species of Wakaleo, a genus of the Thylacoleonidae family. The size and form is to comparable a small lioness.

Fossil material of this species is fragmentary and rare, and it is only known amongst the Alcoota local fauna.
Further evidence of the animals cranial and dental features were examined in 2014, leading to a revision of Wakaleo alcootaensis that provided further support to the separation from earlier Wakaleo species.

References

External links
Natural Worlds
Mysterious Australia

Miocene mammals of Australia
Miocene marsupials
Wakaleo